Lake Minchin is a name of an ancient lake in the Altiplano of South America. It existed where today the Salar de Uyuni, Salar de Coipasa and Lake Poopó lie. It was formerly considered the highest lake in the Altiplano but research indicated that the highest shoreline belongs to the later Lake Tauca instead.

The concept of a "Lake Minchin" was first coined in 1906 and the name is based on John B. Minchin. The dating of the lake varies but probably lasted until 22,000 – 21,000 BP. A glacier advance was in progress in the Andes during that time period.

The name "Minchin" has also been used in other contexts, and it has been proposed that the lake was actually a combination of several different paleolakes.

Definition 
The name "Lake Minchin" has been used inconsistently to refer to either a lake existing 45,000 years ago, the highest lake in the Altiplano, or to sediment formations.

This confusion has led to calls to drop the usage of the name "Minchin".

An alternative theory postulates that Lake Minchin was formed by several lakes, including Ouki and Inca Huasi. Sometimes the term "Minchin" is also applied to the whole hydrological system Titicaca-Rio Desaguadero-Lake Poopo-Salar de Coipasa-Salar de Uyuni, or to the highest ancient lake in the Altiplano (usually known as Lake Tauca). There are also contradictions between lake level records in different parts of the system.

Context 
During its history a number of lakes appeared and then disappeared on the Altiplano. Lake Minchin was one of the first of these ancient lakes to be described. These lakes were identified by the lake terraces, sediments and bioherms. Earlier lakes such as Lake Escara are documented from drill holes in the Salar de Uyuni. Later lakes include Lake Tauca and Lake Coipasa. As early as 1861 there are reports that lake deposits exist on the Altiplano. John B. Minchin in 1882 reported the existence of encrustations around Lake Poopo and the salars south of Coipasa. He postulated that a lake with a surface area of  left these encrustations and that the nitrate deposits in the Atacama and Tarapaca were likewise formed by water draining for this lake.

Some estimates of the size of this lake claimed that it reached from Lake Titicaca as far as 27° South.

The name "Lake Minchin" was applied in 1906 by Steinmann, who applied it to the Uyuni basin, while naming the lake covering the Poopo and Coipasa basins "Lake Reck". The name was applied in honour of John B. Minchin. Later it was found that Lake Titicaca was not part of Lake Minchin and the theory was put forward that meltwater from glaciers had formed the lake. A different lake (Lake Ballivian) was also defined which encompassed Lake Titicaca. The relationship between various deposits in the southern Altiplano and these around Lake Titicaca was unclear at the beginning of the research history.

Description of the lake 

Lake Minchin was a saltwater lake, which covered the basins of the Salar de Uyuni, Salar de Coipasa, Lake Poopo and Salar de Empexa, including the towns of Llica, Oruro and the Desaguadero River valley.

Area and altitude
A sill at Ulloma separated Lake Minchin from Lake Titicaca. In the Poopo basin, water levels may have reached . Such water depths exceed these of preceding lakes, and together with even higher water levels of the subsequent Lake Tauca they are part of a trend of increasing water levels in the southern Altiplano which contrasts with progressively decreasing lake levels in the northern Altiplano. Earlier research suggested an opposite trend of lowering water levels in both basins. If Minchin reached a water level of  it may have spilled into the Pilcomayo River, draining from there via the Rio de la Plata into the Atlantic Ocean. It is also possible that the lake temporarily drained into the Pacific Ocean through its southwesternmost sector at Salar de Ascotán; such an outlet would have existed for only a brief time, however, before it was obstructed by volcanism. San Agustin, San Cristobal and Colcha formed islands in the lake, which was separated into a Coipasa half and an Uyuni half by a peninsula of the Serranía Intersalar; straits at Llica and Salinas de Garci Mendoza connected the two halves. Bays developed close to Isluga, Empexa and Ollagüe.

Flora and fauna
Sediments left by the lake indicate the presence of gastropods, ostracods and stromatolites. At Estancia Vinto, several different species have been found, including the ostracods Amphicypris, Candonopsis, Darwinula, Limnocythere, Limnocythere bradburyi, Limnocythere titicaca and the molluscs Anysancylus crequii, Ecpomastrum mirum, Littoridina poopoensis, Taphius montanus. Some species variation may indicate that water levels at the site fluctuated; for example the deepwater diatoms Cyclotella meneghiniana and Cyclotella stelligera but also benthic species. Around the lake, Polylepis expanded and quantities of water supported Isoetes and Myriophyllum. In comparison to Lake Tauca, the climate around Lake Minchin was more favourable to the development of vegetation, probably thanks to higher temperatures and a lower water level. On the other hand, the lake may have acted as a barrier and prevented the movement of animals and plants between the south and north of the lake. The repeated expansion and shrinkage of the Altiplano lakes like Minchin influenced the evolution of Orestias fish species.

It was dominated by sodium chloride, sodium-chloride-carbonate and sodium-chloride-sulfate salts, as determined from studies on diatoms; close to the inlet of the Desaguadero River the waters were less salty. Sedimentation rates in the Uyuni basin of Lake Minchin did not exceed . When the lake dried up, it left clay and sand deposits in the Altiplano. Since its desiccation, shorelines have been tilted over the last 17,000 years.

Chronology 
The early research in 1978 distinguished a Lake Minchin between 32,000–30,000 years ago and a later Lake Tauca. The exact history of Lake Minchin was little understood at that time, with uranium-thorium dating yielding ages of 44,000–34,000 and 72,000–68,000 years BP. These two phases were also called "Upper Minchin" and "Lower Minchin". However, it was later found that radiocarbon dates on these samples indicated much lower ages, from 28,000 years ago to dates too old for radiocarbon dating. Between 31,000 and 26,000 the lake would have reached its highest and around 27,500 BP its second highest level. The lake probably did dried up after about 22,000 BP. Based on sedimentation rates in the Uyuni basin, it is likely that Lake Minchin was not continuous in existence during this period. Other dates extend the time period of Lake Minchin until 21,000 years BP, or set it earlier at 38,000 years BP, or define it as a humid period between 46,000-36,000 years ago or older. Yet another proposal postulates that the earliest deep lake occurred 120,000–98,000 years ago. The S4 layer in the brines of Salar de Uyuni has been attributed to the Minchin stage. Finally, it has been suggested that Lake Minchin was actually the same wet phase as the Inca Huasi wet phase.

Origin 
The formation of Lake Minchin was at first explained with glacial meltwater formed during an interglacial. This idea was disputed because the growth of lakes happens at the same time as the growth of glaciers rather than afterwards. An alternative explanation postulates an increase of precipitation over the Altiplano. Higher insolation may have played a role in the expansion of Lake Minchin. Water from Lake Titicaca may have contributed to the formation of Lake Minchin. An old theory that the Altiplano lakes were formerly part of the ocean is considered to be untenable in light of the lack of marine sediments and the fact that the fish fauna is made up of freshwater species.

Related events 
A regional glacial maximum has been associated with the existence of Lake Minchin. The Choqueyapu II glacier advance was probably under way during the Lake Minchin phase and eventually led to the local Last Glacial Maximum, and the Canabaya glacier advance in the Cordillera Real may also be linked to the Minchin phase, as is the formation of glaciers on mountains of the Puna and in northern Chile.

Summer insolation was increased during the Lake Minchin period. During the Lake Minchin period, precipitation on the Altiplano was higher than today. This precipitation increase started 54,800 years ago, while the time period between Lake Minchin and Lake Tauca featured a dry climate. ENSO variations also occurred during the Minchin period.

Minchin is also the name of a water-level highstand of Lake Titicaca at about  altitude. The highstand phase there ended about 20,000 BP. Terraces of the southern and eastern Lake Titicaca shores have been linked to the Minchin highstand.

Water level rises are also recorded from lakes and salt pans in Atacama Altiplano, subtropical Andes and the southern Lipez region during the time of Lake Minchin and in lesser measure during the time of Lake Tauca, where they may have formed from increased precipitation. The Salar de Atacama likewise was wetter between 53,400–15,300 years ago and hillslope activity increased in the Salar Grande basin of the Atacama Desert. Also associated with the Lake Minchin period are an increased landslide activity in northwest Argentina, the formation of lakes behind such landslides, a saline phase in the Laguna de los Pozuelos lake, an increase in runoff and of sediment deposition along the Pativilca valley and along the Rio Pisco in Peru as well as probable subsequent erosion, and increased moisture availability in the Serra dos Carajas area of Brazil. Finally, river terraces formed at that time in the Rio Majes, Rio Ramis valleys and in the Lomas de Lachay.

References

Sources

External links 
 Hydro‐isostatic deflection and tectonic tilting in the central Andes: Initial results of a GPS survey of Lake Minchin shorelines
 Aguas, Glaciares y cambios climaticos en los Andes tropicales

Geology of Bolivia
Former lakes of South America
Lakes of Bolivia
Pleistocene